DNB Arena may refer to:
 DNB Arena (Trondheim), a football stadium in Trondheim, Norway
 DNB Arena (Stavanger), an ice-hockey rink in Stavanger, Norway